It's About time is the sixth album released by British jazz fusion duo Morrissey–Mullen. It reached position 95 in the UK album charts in 1983.

The album was produced by Richard Niles, who also wrote some of the songs.

The title track is in tribute to the US saxophonist Teddy Edwards who had recently had a "duel" with Dick Morrissey at London's 100 Club.

Track listing 

"Stop and Look Around"
"It's About Time"
"Ounce of Bounce"
"So so Fine"
"Ol' Sax and Captain Axe"
"Bladerunner"
"Why Does It Always Happen to Me?"
"I Pull the Strings"
"Do I Do"
"Above the Clouds"

Personnel 
Dick Morrissey - tenor saxophone
Jim Mullen - guitar
Tessa Niles - vocals
Joe Hubbard - bass
Neil Wilkinson - drums
Chris Fletcher - percussion
Damon Butcher - keyboards

References 

1983 albums
Beggars Banquet Records albums
Morrissey–Mullen albums